Portugal was represented at the 2014 Summer Youth Olympics, held in Nanjing, China, from 16 to 28 August 2014, with a delegation of 21 competitors, who took part in 10 events.

The Portuguese delegation won two medals, a silver in sailing by Rodolfo Pires and a bronze in trampoline gymnastics by Pedro Ferreira. In addition, two gold medals were won by Portuguese athletes as part of mixed teams: in judo by Maria Siderot and in modern pentathlon by Maria Teixeira.

Medalists

Athletics

Portugal qualified two athletes.

Girls
Field events

Qualification legend: Q=Final A (medal); qB=Final B (non-medal); qC=Final C (non-medal); qD=Final D (non-medal); qE=Final E (non-medal)

Canoeing

Portugal qualified one boat based on its performance at the 2013 World Junior Canoe Sprint and Slalom Championships.

Boys

Cycling

Portugal qualified a boys' and girls' team based on its ranking issued by the UCI.

Team

Mixed Relay

Gymnastics

Artistic Gymnastics

Portugal qualified one athlete based on its performance at the 2014 European WAG Championships.

Girls

Trampoline

Portugal qualified one athlete based on its performance at the 2014 European Trampoline Championships.

Judo

Portugal qualified two athletes based on its performance at the 2013 Cadet World Judo Championships.

Individual

Team

Modern pentathlon

Portugal qualified two athletes based on the 1 June 2014 Olympic Youth A Pentathlon World Rankings.

Sailing

Portugal qualified two boats based on its performance at the Byte CII European Continental Qualifiers.

Swimming

Portugal qualified four swimmers.

Boys

Girls

Table tennis

Portugal qualified one athlete based on its performance at the European Qualification Event.

Singles

Team

Qualification Legend: Q=Main Bracket (medal); qB=Consolation Bracket (non-medal)

Triathlon

Portugal qualified one athlete based on its performance at the 2014 European Youth Olympic Games Qualifier.

Individual

Relay

References

2014 in Portuguese sport
Nations at the 2014 Summer Youth Olympics
Portugal at the Youth Olympics